The 2001 Bangladeshi presidential election was held on November 12, 2001. A. Q. M. Badruddoza Chowdhury won the election uncontestedly. Initially, two nomination papers were submitted. Later, the other contestant withdrew his nomination making Chowdhury elected to the post of President. Badruddoza sworn in on November 14, 2001, and assumed the office of President.

References

2001 elections in Bangladesh
Bangladesh
Presidential elections in Bangladesh
November 2001 events in Bangladesh